"Hot Mess" is a song recorded by the American pop punk band Cobra Starship. It was the second single released from their third studio album, Hot Mess. The song was released digitally through iTunes on October 30, 2009. The single has been released in the United States and New Zealand. It was used in the films Bucky Larson: Born to Be a Star and American Pie Presents: The Book of Love and in the TV series Gossip Girl.

Music video
The music video for this song was released for viewers in the United States on November 9, 2009, on MTV. It shows Gabe Saporta driving a walk-in van (with flashing lights, girls and people in sanitation clothing in the back) through New York City, working for an organization called the Cobra Crew. This organization takes people into the van, evidently to party. Saporta is then kicked out of the driver's seat and a girl starts driving the van, out-of-control at this point. The action transfers to a club, where most of the people from the van continue the party. The video ends with Saporta lying unconscious on the floor of the van, with "Hot Mess" scrawled on his chest in red make-up.

I'm a Hot Mess, Help Me! – The Remix EP
 "Hot Mess" (DJ Cirkut Remix)
 "Hot Mess" (Nervo Remix Extended)
 "Hot Mess" (Suave Suarez on Pleasure Ryland Remix)

Chart performance
"Hot Mess" debuted at number 64 on the Billboard Hot 100. It re-entered the chart at number 88 in the week ending January 9, 2010.

Charts and certifications

Weekly charts

Certifications

References

Cobra Starship songs
2009 singles
Songs written by Kara DioGuardi
Songs written by Bruno Mars
Songs written by Philip Lawrence (songwriter)
2009 songs
Songs written by Kevin Rudolf
Fueled by Ramen singles
Songs written by Mike Caren
Songs written by Oliver Goldstein